Stéphane Roy may refer to:

Ice hockey
 Stéphane Roy (ice hockey, born 1967)
 Stéphane Roy (ice hockey, born 1976)

Others
 Stéphane Roy (composer), Canadian composer
 Stéphane E. Roy, Canadian actor and comedian